Max Ordman (17 June 1926 – 12 January 2002) was a South African wrestler. He competed in the men's freestyle heavyweight at the 1960 Summer Olympics.

Ordman won the light heavyweight wrestling gold medal at the 1950 Maccabiah Games in Israel.

References

1926 births
2002 deaths
Maccabiah Games gold medalists for South Africa
Maccabiah Games medalists in wrestling
Competitors at the 1950 Maccabiah Games
South African male sport wrestlers
Olympic wrestlers of South Africa
Wrestlers at the 1960 Summer Olympics
Sportspeople from Germiston